American Telugu Association (ATA) is a non-profit organization of Telugu people living in North America.

The primary purpose of the association  is to assist and promote literary, cultural, religious, social, educational, economic, health and community activities of the people of Telugu origin as well as to promoting exchange programs for students, scientists, and professionals of Telugu origin between the United States of America, Canada, India and other countries.

References

Telugu society
Telugu organizations in North America
Telugu American
Non-profit organizations based in the United States
International Telugu Associations